Jack Sharpe may refer to:

 Jack Sharpe (musician) (1930–1994), English jazz saxophonist and bandleader
 Jack Sharpe (songwriter) (1909–1996), American songwriter, music publishing executive and author
 Jack Sharpe (footballer) (1866–1936), English footballer
 St George Henry Rathbone who wrote under this pseudonym.

See also 
 Jack Sharp (disambiguation)
 John Sharpe (disambiguation)